Sarabah is a small national park in South East Queensland, Australia, 65 km south of Brisbane.  The park lies within the catchment area of the Albert River.

The park contains the remains of lowland subtropical rainforest and fringing riparian open forest along Canungra Creek.  It was declared a national park in 1973.  At just  in size, it is Queensland's smallest national park.

See also

 Protected areas of Queensland

References

National parks of South East Queensland
Protected areas established in 1973
1973 establishments in Australia